Sand scorpion may refer to:

 Black sand scorpion (Urodacus novaehollandiae)
 Giant sand scorpion or Dune scorpion (Smeringurus mesaensis)
 Yellow sand scorpion (Lychas buchari)

Animal common name disambiguation pages